Kanchubeh (also Romanized as Kanchūbeh; also known as Ganchūbeh) is a village in Yaft Rural District, Moradlu District, Meshgin Shahr County, Ardabil Province, Iran. At the 2006 census, its population was 727, in 160 families.

References 

Tageo

Towns and villages in Meshgin Shahr County